The Devonport Warriors are a defunct basketball team that competed in Australia's National Basketball League (NBL). It was based in the city of Devonport, Tasmania.

Season by season 

Defunct National Basketball League (Australia) teams
Basketball teams in Tasmania
Basketball teams established in 1983
Basketball teams disestablished in 1984
Sport in Devonport, Tasmania